Vidhi Thanna Vilakku is a 1962 Indian Malayalam-language film, directed by S. S. Rajan and produced by Guruvayoorappan Pictures. The film stars Sathyan, Ragini, Sukumari and Muthukulam Raghavan Pillai.

Cast
 
Sathyan 
Ragini 
Sukumari 
Muthukulam Raghavan Pillai 
Ramesh
Sebastian Kunjukunju Bhagavathar 
Bahadoor 
Chandni 
GK Pillai 
Rajam
S. P. Pillai

Soundtrack
The music was composed by V. Dakshinamoorthy and lyrics were written by P. Bhaskaran and Abhayadev.

References

External links
 

1962 films
1960s Malayalam-language films